The Road to Babel (Spanish:El camino de Babel) is a 1945 Spanish comedy film directed by Jerónimo Mihura and starring Alfredo Mayo, Guillermina Grin and Fernando Fernán Gómez. Its style was close to that of a screwball comedy.

Cast

References

Bibliography
 Labanyi, Jo & Pavlović, Tatjana. A Companion to Spanish Cinema. John Wiley & Sons, 2012.

External links 

1945 films
1945 comedy films
Spanish comedy films
1940s Spanish-language films
Films directed by Jerónimo Mihura
Spanish black-and-white films
1940s Spanish films